Carolina del Pilar Gaitán Lozano (born 4 April 1984) is a Colombian actress and singer. She studied at the Lee Strasberg Theater and Film Institute in New York and has been awarded two Premios Tu Mundo from Telemundo.

She has starred in many series with lead roles in Celia, Sin Senos Sí Hay Paraíso, and Narcos, among many others. She has also worked on several musicals at Colombia's National Theater. As a singer, she has lent her voice to many TV theme songs and has her album composed by her. Her musical project combines the sounds of various tropical currents empowering Latin women with salsa, son, and bolero, among others. 

She participated in The Greatest Showman promotional theme "This is Me" and voiced Pepa Madrigal in the 2021 Disney animated film Encanto.  She is also participating as a judge in the renowned reality show X Factor Colombia.

Filmography

Television

Film

Discography

Extended plays

Singles

As a lead artist

Promotional singles

Other charted songs

Awards and nominations

References

External links 
 

1984 births
Living people
Colombian telenovela actresses
People from Villavicencio
21st-century Colombian women